Garden Reach Shipbuilders & Engineers Ltd, abbreviated as GRSE, is one of India's leading shipyards, located in Kolkata. It builds and repairs commercial and naval vessels. GRSE also builds export ships.

Founded in 1884 as a small privately-owned company on the eastern bank of the Hooghly River, it was renamed as Garden Reach Workshop in 1916. The company was nationalised by the Government of India in 1960. It was awarded the Miniratna status, with accompanying financial and operational autonomy in September 2006. It is first Indian shipyard to build 100 warships.

Facilities
GRSE has ship building facilities in Kolkata and a diesel engine plant in Ranchi.

It has a large Computer Aided Design (CAD) centre for ship modelling and design. There are four workshops for plate preparation and steel fabrication.

It has a building berth and two slipways for hull construction. It has a covered all-weather non-tidal wet basin for fitting-out medium and small ships and another fitting-out complex for ships with three berths alongside. GRSE has engine assemble, test, repair and overhaul facilities in Ranchi, which acquires 62acres of land.

On 1 July 2006, GRSE acquired the loss-making Rajabagan Dockyard (RBD) of Central Inland Water Transport Corporation (CIWTC). RBD's facilities with its  waterfront helped alleviate some of GRSE's space constraints and increase its production capacity.

As of 2011, the shipyard was undergoing a  upgrade programme, expected to be completed by March 2012. The second phase of the upgrade programme was scheduled to commence from June 2013.

Vessels built

Commercial vessels
Among commercial and scientific ships, GRSE builds oceanographic and hydrographic research vessels, marine acoustic research ships, non-propelled dredgers, grab hopper dredgers, trailing suction hopper dredgers, tugboats, and bulk carriers.

Naval vessels

GRSE has designed and built a number of warships and patrol vessels for the Indian Navy and the Coast Guard. Vessels built at GRSE include guided-missile frigates, corvettes, fleet tankers, fast patrol vessels, amphibious warfare vessels and hovercraft.

In September 2011, it was awarded a ₹2,176 crore contract for building eight landing craft utility vessels.

It has been awarded a contract to build four s. On 18 February 2015, the Indian government approved the construction of seven s, three of which will be constructed by Garden Reach Shipbuilding.

Exports

GRSE delivered the corvette  to Mauritius on 20 December 2014. The contract was worth $58.5 million. With this, India will join the elite club of warship exporters. The Mauritius offshore patrol vessel has an integrated bridge system and cutting edge controls and main engines and can support 83 member crew.

GRSE has been short-listed for a patrol boat project for Vietnam worth  and is also bidding for an order of two frigates for Philippines.

GRSE was the lowest bidder to supply two light frigates to Philippines and hopes to receive the contract worth more than $321 million in the next two months. A total of four firms joined the bidding for the Philippine Navy project: GRSE; Hyundai Heavy Industries Inc. and Daewoo Shipbuilding & Marine Engineering Co. Ltd., both from South Korea; and Navantia S.A. of Spain. GRSE's light frigate will be a design based on the Indian Navy's Kamorta-class anti-submarine corvette and will be capable of withstanding Sea State 7, which means it can withstand a wave height of up to 9 metres.

See also 
 List of shipbuilders and shipyards in India
 Cochin Shipyard Limited, Cochin
 Hooghly Cochin Shipyard Limited, Kolkata
 Titagarh Wagons, West Bengal
 Mazagon Dock Shipbuilders, Mumbai
 Hindustan Shipyard, Visakhapatnam
 Shalimar Works (1980) Ltd, Howrah
 Goa Shipyard
 Inland Waterways Authority of India
 Shyama Prasad Mukerjee Port, Kolkata

References

Shipbuilding companies of India
Diesel engine manufacturers
Marine engine manufacturers
Indian Navy
Government-owned companies of India
Companies nationalised by the Government of India
Engine manufacturers of India
Manufacturing companies based in Kolkata
Indian companies established in 1884
Manufacturing companies established in 1884
Companies listed on the National Stock Exchange of India
Companies listed on the Bombay Stock Exchange